Milano is a city in Milam County, Texas, United States, located at the intersection of U.S. Route 79 and State Highway 36, twelve miles southeast of Cameron, the county seat. Its population was 390 at the 2020 census.

On November 5, 1960, country music singer Johnny Horton was killed by a drunk driver on Highway 79 near Milano on his way home from a performance at the Skyline Club in Austin, Texas.

Geography

Milano is located at  (30.709190, –96.863420).

History
The International-Great Northern Railroad Company laid out the original site of Milano in 1874, about a mile and a half west of the city's present site. A United States post office opened there the same year.  Soon, a Baptist church was also established in the area. The community around Milano became a voting precinct in 1880.

Local sources offer several possibilities for the origin of the name "Milano." One story suggests that the town was simply named after Milan, Italy, because of similarities in the climate, but truly, the climate of Milan in Northern Italy, is cold and continental; another says that the name was supposed to have been "Milam," but the United States Post Office Department either got it wrong or changed it intentionally because another Milam, Texas, already existed.

Nevertheless, when the Gulf, Colorado and Santa Fe Railroad Company built the section of track between Brenham and Belton in 1881, it established the town of Milano Junction at the railway's intersection with the International-Great Northern, about two miles east of Milano. As the focus of social and economic life shifted to the new town, Milano became "Old Milano" and Milano Junction became Milano. By the late 1880s, Milano was a commercial hub, with 500 residents, and served as a shipping point for cotton and hides produced in the area. Truck farming became an important industry for Milano in the 1920s, with tomatoes, watermelon, and cantaloupes as the principal crops.

The small city of Milano reached its population peak in 1939, when approximately 920 residents were reported to be living there. The number of local residents began to decline in the early 1940s, and fell to a low of 380 by the early 1970s, before beginning to grow again in the late 1970s. By the time Milano was finally incorporated in the early 1980s, the city officially had 468 residents.

Demographics

As of the 2020 United States census, there were 390 people, 229 households, and 174 families residing in the city.

As of the census of 2000, there were 400 people, 151 households, and 112 families residing in the city. The population density was 205.3 people per square mile (79.2/km). There were 192 housing units at an average density of 98.5/sq mi (38.0/km). The racial makeup of the city was 82.00% White, 11.75% African American, 2.00% Native American, 0.75% Asian, 3.50% from other races. Hispanic or Latino of any race were 11.50% of the population.

There were 151 households, out of which 36.4% had children under the age of 18 living with them, 53.6% were married couples living together, 14.6% had a female householder with no husband present, and 25.2% were non-families. 23.2% of all households were made up of individuals, and 13.9% had someone living alone who was 65 years of age or older. The average household size was 2.65 and the average family size was 3.13.

In the city, the population was spread out, with 27.8% under the age of 18, 11.8% from 18 to 24, 24.8% from 25 to 44, 20.8% from 45 to 64, and 15.0% who were 65 years of age or older. The median age was 38 years. For every 100 females, there were 88.7 males. For every 100 females age 18 and over, there were 94.0 males.

The median income for a household in the city was $28,750, and the median income for a family was $37,292. Males had a median income of $30,417 versus $19,107 for females. The per capita income for the city was $13,771. About 14.6% of families and 17.8% of the population were below the poverty line, including 23.0% of those under age 18 and 9.4% of those age 65 or over.

Education

The City of Milano is served by the Milano Independent School District:
 Milano Elementary School (grades Pre-K–5)
 Milano Junior High School (grades 6–8)
 Milano High School (grades 9–12)

References

External links

Cities in Texas
Cities in Milam County, Texas
Populated places established in 1880